Pares is a small town in central Antigua. it is located to the north of Potworks Dam and south of the township of Parham on the road between Freemans and Willikies.

Demographics 
Pares has two enumeration districts.

 51100 Pares-East
 51200 Pares-West

Census Data (2011)

References

Miller, D. (ed.) (2005) Caribbean Islands. (4th edition). Footscray, VIC: Lonely Planet.
Scott, C. R. (ed.) (2005) Insight guide: Caribbean (5th edition). London: Apa Publications.

Saint Peter Parish, Antigua and Barbuda
Populated places in Antigua and Barbuda